Christopher Olonyokie Ole-Sendeka (born 1 January 1964) is a Tanzanian CCM politician and Member of Parliament for Simanjiro constituency since 2010.

References

1964 births
Living people
Chama Cha Mapinduzi MPs
Tanzanian MPs 2005–2010
Tanzanian MPs 2010–2015
Monduli Secondary School alumni
Old Moshi Secondary School alumni